Vladislav Vasilev (born 30 November 1982) is a Bulgarian footballer who currently plays for Botev Lukovit as a striker.

References

External links
 

1982 births
Living people
Bulgarian footballers
First Professional Football League (Bulgaria) players
PFC Vidima-Rakovski Sevlievo players
PFC Spartak Varna players
PFC Spartak Pleven players
Association football forwards